Otto Cornelis Adriaan van Lidth de Jeude (7 July 1881 – 1 February 1952) was a Dutch politician of the defunct Liberal State Party (LSP) now merged into the People's Party for Freedom and Democracy (VVD).

Decorations

References

External links

Official
  Jhr.Ir. O.C.A. (Otto) van Lidth de Jeude Parlement & Politiek

1881 births
1952 deaths
Delft University of Technology alumni
Dutch civil engineers
Dutch corporate directors
Dutch nonprofit directors
Dutch people of World War II
Freedom Party (Netherlands) politicians
Ministers of Transport and Water Management of the Netherlands
Ministers of War of the Netherlands
Members of the House of Representatives (Netherlands)
Members of the Provincial Council of South Holland
Members of the Provincial-Executive of South Holland
Municipal councillors in Utrecht (province)
Liberal State Party politicians
Jonkheers of the Netherlands
People from Baarn
People from Tiel
People's Party for Freedom and Democracy politicians
20th-century Dutch civil servants
20th-century Dutch engineers
20th-century Dutch politicians